Buschwiller is a commune in the Haut-Rhin department in Alsace in north-eastern France.

See also
 Communes of the Haut-Rhin department

Geography and climate

Geography
Buschwiller is a village located in the French part of the agglomeration of Basel. It is adjacent to the Swiss town of Schönenbuch.

Climate

Due to its position, in the far north-east of France, Buschwiller features a semi-continental climate (Köppen : Cfb), characterized by warm to hot, humid summers and cool to cold, drier winters. It usually snows every year, but without substantial accumulation.

.

References

Communes of Haut-Rhin